is a 2016 Japanese comedy film directed by Yoji Yamada and starring Isao Hashizume, Kazuko Yoshiyuki, Masahiko Nishimura, Yui Natsukawa, Tomoko Nakajima, Hayashiya Shōzō IX, Satoshi Tsumabuki and Yū Aoi. It was released in Japan by Shochiku on March 12, 2016. The film uses the same cast as Yamada's 2013 film Tokyo Family.

Plot summary
A husband (Isao Hashizume) and wife (Kazuko Yoshiyuki) have been married for 50 years. For her birthday, the husband asks the wife what she wants for her birthday present. She replies that she wants a divorce. The wife's divorce announcement sends the entire family into chaos. Their children are thrown into a state of panic to hear this news of separation. Amid the sudden tumult of life, each member of the family begins to voice out their respective grievances.

Cast
Isao Hashizume
Kazuko Yoshiyuki
Masahiko Nishimura
Yui Natsukawa
Tomoko Nakajima
Hayashiya Shōzō IX
Satoshi Tsumabuki
Yū Aoi
Nakamura Takanosuke
Jun Fubuki
Shōfukutei Tsurube II
Nenji Kobayashi

Reception

Sequels

Remake 
In December 2016 it was confirmed that the film would be remade in China, under a co-production between Edko and Shanghai Yiyantang Entertainment. The remake was directed by Huang Lei, who co-starred alongside his wife Sun Li.

References

External links
 

Japanese comedy films
2016 comedy films
Films directed by Yoji Yamada
Shochiku films
2010s Japanese films